"Paris 1919" is a song written by Welsh musician John Cale. It was released as the sixth track on his third solo studio album of the same name (1973).

Recording
"Paris 1919" is the sixth song on Cale's third solo studio album, Paris 1919 (1973). The song's backing band was not credited until 2006 in the album's expanded version. The meaning of the lyrics are unknown. Because of this, there are many interpretations of its meaning. Some think it represents a failed wedding during World War I. Others believe it just represents the feeling of the people after the first World War had ended, relieved it was over, but aware the problems were still there.

Alternate version 
In 2006, a reissue of Paris 1919 was released, featuring bonus tracks - rehearsals and alternate versions, and a hidden track (an instrumental of "Macbeth"). "Paris 1919" received two alternate versions, a string mix and a piano mix. The string mix replaced all the instruments with string instruments. It lasts 22 seconds longer. The piano mix on the other hand lasts a full 2 minutes and 2 seconds longer. It replaces all of the instruments with pianos. The song cuts off at the 4:22 mark and the remaining 1:47 is just silence.

Release and critical reception
Following Paris 1919'''s release in 1973, the reviews were mostly favourable. Rolling Stone compares "Paris 1919" to Harry Nilsson's "Mourning Glory Story".Far Out Magazine said, "the tune is one of Cale’s most astonishing examples of sound, melding orchestral flourishes with a jaunty chorus. Written against the backdrop of 1919, Cale lets characters walk in and out of the narrative, padding out the soundscape like a prize chess player searching for that ultimate killing move."Let it Rock said the song, "begins with urgent cello cross-rhythms to tell the tale of a female ghost appearing out of a clock at irregular intervals, then erupts into a chorus of 'you're a ghost/La la la la/I'm the church and I'm come/To claim you with my iron drum' which is weirdly reminiscent of the Bee Gees' "New York Mining Disaster". The possibility of plagiarism doesn't arise because Cale is deliberately dealing with bizarre juxtapositions."Musikexpress'' named it the 351st greatest song of all time, calling it "lyrically demanding, melodically complex, kitsch-free baroque pop of the highest quality".

References 

1973 songs
John Cale songs
Song recordings produced by Chris Thomas (record producer)
Songs written by John Cale